Norman Charles Collins (7 May 1904 – 28 August 1933) was an Australian rules footballer who played with Fitzroy, Carlton and Hawthorn in the Victorian Football League (VFL).

Football

Fitzroy (VFL)
Born in Malvern, Collins played his junior football for Fitzroy and in 1924 made his VFL debut, alongside his elder brother Goldie. Another brother, Harry, had also played at Fitzroy but was killed in 1918 while fighting in France.

Fitzroy had won a premiership in 1922.

Carlton (VFL)
As Collins found it difficult to break into the team, he transferred to Carlton after two seasons.

He was used initially at Carlton as a centreman but after sitting out of the 1928 VFL season the position had been taken up by new recruit Colin Martyn. When he returned in 1929, the former Fitzroy player was tried as a half forward flanker, rover and defender. He played finals that year, kicking two goals in Carlton's losing Preliminary Final team. However, he soon found himself out of favour and missed selection in the 1930 finals series and played only once in 1931.

Hawthorn (VFL)
Collins crossed to Hawthorn during the 1931 season where he played as a defender. He filled in as Hawthorn's captain on occasion. He retired in 1933, citing an inability to strike form.

Death
Just two months after making his last appearance for Hawthorn Collins committed suicide.

Notes

References
 Holmesby, Russell; Main, Jim (2014). The Encyclopedia of AFL Footballers: every AFL/VFL player since 1897 (10th ed.). Melbourne, Victoria: Bas Publishing. 

1904 births
1933 deaths
1933 suicides
Australian rules footballers from Melbourne
Australian Rules footballers: place kick exponents
Fitzroy Football Club players
Carlton Football Club players
Hawthorn Football Club players
Suicides by hanging in Australia
Suicides in Victoria (Australia)
People from Malvern, Victoria